Aditi Technologies is an American IT company, headquartered in Bellevue, Washington, United States with the largest center in Bangalore, India. Aditi was acquired by Symphony Teleca in April 2014. On 9 April 2015, Harman International Industries Incorporated acquired Symphony Teleca Corporation. On 12 November 2016, Samsung entered into a definitive agreement to acquire Harman International.

Corporate history

Early years 
Pradeep Singh founded Aditi Technologies in 1994 after nine years in management positions at Microsoft, including General Manager of the Windows 95 mobile services group. Aditi began as a Microsoft Service Shop providing support services to Microsoft customers around the globe.

In 1999, Talisma (A Customer Relationship Management division of Aditi) was spun off in 1999. The founding of Talisma was driven by the concept of supporting customers through various modes of communication using the Internet. Pradeep Singh spent the next 10 years in Talisma building the company.

In 2008, Campus Management acquired the Talisma brand and Talisma Corporation Pvt. Ltd. in Bangalore and its higher education business unit based in Bellevue, Washington.

Growth period
In 2003 Pradeep Singh came back to Aditi and he shifted the focus of the company to the Outsourced Product Development space, an area that  Aditi spent its first 12 years exclusively servicing Microsoft.

In 2004, Aditi partnered with PI Corporation for developing software targeted at the Linux environment.

Since 2006, it was involved in Product development and software testing based on Microsoft's software platforms.

In October 2007, Pradeep Rathinam was appointed as President and then Chief Executive Officer of Aditi Technologies.

In August 2010, Aditi Technologies partnered with Quest Software to migrate and upgrade customers to SharePoint 2010 and SharePoint Online.

In 2011, Aditi forayed into Cloud Services space with the acquisition of Seattle based Cloud Computing start-up Cumulux. With the acquisition, Aditi invested $5 million in Azure Acceleration Lab an Azure-based rapid application development offering to strengthen its Cloud Computing capabilities.

In May 2013, Aditi expanded its cloud capabilities with the acquisition of Get Cloud Ready, thus entering the AWS market.

On 10 April 2014, Aditi announced that it was being acquired by Symphony Teleca for an undisclosed amount. Following the acquisition, Sanjay Dhawan took over as CEO and Pradeep Rathinam was appointed as President, with Aditi becoming an independent business unit of Symphony Teleca.

Acquisitions
 In 2007, Aditi Technologies acquired Parlano based MindAlign, which was engaged in developing Enterprise Collaboration Applications and product IP-based solutions for global financial services institutions company
 In 2010, Aditi Technologies acquired Infospace India development centre, which was engaged in online product development, software engineering and product testing
 In Nov 2011, Aditi acquired Seattle-based cloud-computing start-up, Cumulux, for an undisclosed amount.
 In May 2013, Aditi Technologies acquired Hyderabad based Cloud Consulting company Get Cloud Ready, which was started by Janakiram MSV. Get Cloud Ready provides Get Cloud Ready framework, which helps customers with cloud adoption and operations across cloud platforms.

References

External links
 Aditi Technologies Official Website

Companies based in Bellevue, Washington
Defunct software companies of the United States
International information technology consulting firms
Software companies of India
Outsourcing companies
Cloud computing providers
Internet of things companies
Internet of things
Information technology companies of Bangalore
1994 establishments in Karnataka
Software companies established in 1994
Indian companies established in 1994